ITZ, Itz, or itz may refer to:
 Itz, a river of Thuringia and Bavaria, Germany
 Interfacial transition zone, the area between aggregates and the cement paste in concrete
 Intrathecal ziconotide, an atypical analgesic agent
 Itraconazole, an antifungal medication
 Itzaʼ language's ISO 639-3 code